Azad Hind Express is an express train of Central Railway of Indian Railways linking Pune with Howrah. It is one of the fastest trains in its route with high priority. It covers a distance of 2,015 kilometers at an average speed of 60 km/h.

Route

During its 33-hour journey, the Azad Hind Express stops at 30 stations. Some of the important stations by which it passes are:

Reversal 
It passes through a new Daund chord line which is specifically created to avoid reversal and delays at Daund Junction.

See also 
 Pune–Howrah Duronto Express
 Santragachi–Pune Humsafar Express

References 

Express trains in India
Transport in Pune
Rail transport in Howrah
Rail transport in Maharashtra
Rail transport in Chhattisgarh
Transport in Odisha
Rail transport in West Bengal
Named passenger trains of India